Slave of Rome (also known as Slave Warrior) is a 1961 Italian peplum film written and directed  by Sergio Grieco and starring Rossana Podestà and Guy Madison.

Plot
The peace treaty with Rome was broken when Gaius Valerius and his legion were wiped out by a tribe of Gauls led by Lysircos, so Julius Caesar gave his son, Tribune Marcus Valerius and his British and German auxiliary legionaries,  who were loyal to his father a chance to avenge his death.
Caesar wants to extend his frontiers in Gaul and stop the tribes from joining those of Vercingetorix, the leader of all the Gallic tribes. Among the other tribal leaders, Modius wants to renew the peace treaty with Rome, acknowledging their superior power and wants peace for his beautiful daughter Antea, but Lysiricos wants the Romans out of Gaul. 
Tribune Marcus Valerius now faces a difficult task. Will it be peace or war?

Cast 
  Rossana Podestà as  Antea 	
 Guy Madison as   Marcus Valerius
 Mario Petri as Lycircos 	
 Giacomo Rossi Stuart as Claudius		
 Ignazio Leone  as  Lutinius	
 Raf Baldassarre  as The German Mercenary 
 Niksa Stefanini as 	Modius		 
 Freddy Hunger as  Trullius
 Mirko Boman as Theod 	
 Nando Poggi as Roman Soldier
 Nazzareno Zamperla as Roman Soldier

References

External links

 
1961 adventure films
Peplum films
Films directed by Sergio Grieco
Gallic Wars films
Sword and sandal films
1960s Italian-language films
1960s Italian films